Speakeasy is a 1929 American pre-Code sports drama film directed by Benjamin Stoloff and adapted by Frederick Hazlitt Brennan and Edwin J. Burke. The picture was produced and distributed by Fox Film Corporation. Lola Lane and Paul Page played the lead roles. John Wayne had a minor role in the film as a speakeasy patron. All film elements to this movie are considered lost, but Movietone discs of the soundtrack survive.

Plot

Cast

See also
 John Wayne filmography
 List of lost films

References

External links

1929 films
1920s sports drama films
American sports drama films
American black-and-white films
American boxing films
Films directed by Benjamin Stoloff
Lost American films
Fox Film films
1929 drama films
1920s English-language films
1920s American films